Never the Twain (Czech: Velbloud uchem jehly) is a 1926 Czech silent comedy film directed by Karel Lamač and starring Jan W. Speerger, Betty Kysilková and Anny Ondra. It is based on a play by František Langer. The son of a wealth industrialist marries the daughter of a beggar.

The film's sets were designed by the art director Artur Berger.

Cast
 Jan W. Speerger as Pesta 
 Betty Kysilková as Pestová  
 Anny Ondra as Zuzka Pestová / Lili Weberová  
 Theodor Pištěk as Dairy Shop Customer  
 Karel Lamač as Alík Vilím  
 Hugo Thimig as Joe Vilím  
 Ela Lausmanová as Weberová 
 Čeněk Šlégl as Berka  
 František Havel as Andrejs  
 Karl Noll as Bezchyba  
 Joe Lars as Butler 
 Oldřich Nový as Butler

See also
Camel Through the Eye of a Needle (1936)

References

Bibliography 
 Bock, Hans-Michael & Bergfelder, Tim. The Concise CineGraph. Encyclopedia of German Cinema. Berghahn Books, 2009.

External links 
 

1926 films
Czech silent films
Czech comedy films
1926 comedy films
1920s Czech-language films
Films directed by Karel Lamač
Czech black-and-white films